Roger Karl Hedlund (born 6 November 1979) is a Swedish politician and member of the Riksdag for the Sweden Democrats party since 2014.

Hedlund grew up in Gävle and worked as an industrial engineer. He was a member of the city council in Gävle and has been the Sweden Democrats' district chairman in Gävleborg since 2003. He was elected to the Riksdag during the 2014 Swedish general election. Hedlund sits on the EU Committee in parliament and has campaigned against Swedish financial contributions to the EU in this role.

References 

1979 births
Living people
Swedish eurosceptics
Members of the Riksdag 2014–2018
Members of the Riksdag 2018–2022
Members of the Riksdag from the Sweden Democrats
Members of the Riksdag 2022–2026
21st-century Swedish politicians